The Sylvo-Pastoral and Partial Faunal Reserve of the Sahel is the largest protected area of Burkina Faso, comprising an area of 16,000 km2. Within the area of the nature reserve are temporary lakes (Mare d'Oursi, Mare de Yomboli, Mare de Kissi) being important for migratory birds.

References

Protected areas of Burkina Faso
Faunal reserves